Manouchehri is an Iranian surname. Notable people with the surname include:

Alí Manouchehri (born 1986), Iranian footballer
Amin Manouchehri (born 1986), Iranian footballer
Roxana Manouchehri, Iranian artist
Manuchehri, 11th-century Persian poet

See also
Manouchehri House, a historic building in Kashan, Iran